Opekiska was an unincorporated community located in Monongalia County, West Virginia, United States. The Opekiska Post Office is no longer open.

Opekiska was named after an Indian chief; the native name means "White Day".

References 

Unincorporated communities in West Virginia
Unincorporated communities in Monongalia County, West Virginia
West Virginia populated places on the Monongahela River